The Old Runnymede Church, also known as St. Patrick's Episcopal Church, is a historic church at 11th and Pine Streets in Harper, Kansas.  It was built in 1890 and added to the National Register in 1973.

It is significant as the church of "The Lost Town of Runnymede, Kas., Where Merry English Gentlemen Played at Farming".  It was moved to its current location in 1893.

References

External links
Historical information

Episcopal church buildings in Kansas
Churches on the National Register of Historic Places in Kansas
Buildings and structures in Harper County, Kansas
National Register of Historic Places in Harper County, Kansas